Toni Kähkönen is a Finnish professional ice hockey forward who currently plays for KooKoo in the Liiga. He previously played in his native Finland with Espoo Blues, where he served as captain, and Oulun Kärpät of the Liiga.

Fresh of a Finnish Championship with Kärpät in the 2013–14 season, Kähkönen signed abroad as a free agent in Sweden on a one-year contract with Leksands IF of the SHL on 5 May 2014.

References

External links
 

1986 births
Living people
Espoo Blues players
Karlskrona HK players
KooKoo players
Leksands IF players
Oulun Kärpät players
Sportspeople from Vaasa
Finnish ice hockey forwards